A referendum on the transfer of Riga Cathedral to the Lutheran Church was held in Latvia on 5 and 6 September 1931. Following a 1923 referendum the Lutheran Church had been forced to share the cathedral with the Roman Catholic Church. The referendum was passed by a large margin, and despite a voter turnout of only 32%, the government decided to proceed with the legislation. The outcome of the referendum led to an increase in the popularity of civic parties in the parliamentary elections in October.

Results

References

1931 referendums
1931 in Latvia
Referendums in Latvia